= Port Harcourt International Marathon =

Annual road-running event in Port Harcourt, Nigeria

Port Harcourt International Marathon, formerly known as the Port Harcourt City Marathon, is a road-running event held in Port Harcourt, Rivers State, Nigeria..

== 2026 edition ==
The 2026 edition was held on 14 November 2026 under the theme "The Green Race". It was presented by the organisers as part of efforts to position Port Harcourt as an international sporting and tourism destination.

The competition featured a 21-kilometre race that started and ended at the Polo Club in the Government Reserved Area of Port Harcourt passed through several streets in Port Harcourt. Approximately 3,000 athletes from Nigeria and other countries participated.

Kenyan athlete Timothy Kibii won the men's category. The event was flagged off by Allwell Ihunda, chairman of Port Harcourt City Local Government Area.
